The National Cryptologic School (NCS) is a school within the National Security Agency that provides training to members of the Intelligence Community.

The National Cryptologic School is a Cryptologic Training School within the National Security Agency (NSA). It is responsible for designing, developing, and delivering curriculum in cryptology, information assurance, language, and leadership.

It was opened on November 1, 1965, and is now housed on multiple campuses, including the NSA's Friendship Annex facility in Linthicum, Maryland.

NCS courses are provided to the civilian and military population of the NSA, as well as the Intelligence Community, the military services, and the Central Security Service (CSS). Many of the courses are accredited by the American Council on Education and the Council on Occupational Education, and are eligible for transfer credits at a variety of educational institutions.

Training is delivered via computer-based methods, as well as in the traditional classroom setting. Employees have access to thousands of web-based training courses developed by NSA, as well as those offered by a variety of vendors and agencies throughout the Intelligence Community.

See also 
Dundee Society
Zendian problem
Government Code and Cypher School

References

External links 
 
 
 

National Security Agency
Cryptologic education
Universities and colleges accredited by the Council on Occupational Education